Thomas Fernandez (born 3 August 1970) is a French former professional footballer who played as a defender. He is currently the head coach of Toulouse FC' U19s.

References

1970 births
Living people
Sportspeople from Albi
French footballers
Association football defenders
Toulouse FC players
Pau FC players
Olympique Alès players
La Roche VF players
Vendée Poiré-sur-Vie Football players
Ligue 1 players
French football managers
Footballers from Occitania (administrative region)